Tanaocerus is a genus of desert long-horned grasshoppers in the family Tanaoceridae. There are at least two described species in Tanaocerus.

Species
These two species belong to the genus Tanaocerus:
 Tanaocerus koebelei Bruner, 1906 (Koebele's desert long-horned grasshopper)
 Tanaocerus rugosus Hebard, 1931

References

Further reading

 

Caelifera
Articles created by Qbugbot